The 527th Bombardment Squadron is an inactive United States Air Force unit.  It was last assigned to the 379th Bombardment Wing at Homestead Air Force Base, Florida, where it was inactivated on 9 January 1961, when its parent wing converted to the Boeing B-52H Stratofortress..

The squadron was first activated during World War II.  After training in the United States, it moved to England, where it participated in the strategic bombing campaign against Germany.  The squadron twice was awarded the Distinguished Unit Citation for its combat actions.  Following V-E Day, the squadron moved to Morocco, where it participated in the transportation of military personnel back to the United States until it was inactivated in June 1945.

The squadron was reactivated in 1958 as a Boeing B-47 Stratojet strategic bomber squadron, in response to Strategic Air Command's increased alert commitment.  In 1960, it became non-operational, preparing for inactivation.

History

World War II

Activation and training
The squadron was first activated at Geiger Field, Washington in November 1942 as one of the four original squadrons of the 379th Bombardment Group. After initial organization, a cadre moved to Wendover Field, Utah to begin training as a heavy bomber unit with the Boeing B-17 Flying Fortress. The air echelon moved to Dow Field, Maine, to ferry their Flying Fortresses via the North Atlantic Ferry Route, starting on 15 April.

Combat in the European Theater

The air echelon of the squadron arrived at RAF Bovingdon by 24 April 1943, and remained there until 20 May, when it joined the ground echelon at RAF Kimbolton, which was to be its combat station for the remainder of its time in the European Theater of Operations.  The squadron flew its first combat mission on 29 May, and focused on the strategic bombing campaign against Germany.  This mission was the starting point for the first Distinguished Unit Citation (DUC) awarded to the squadron for its sustained actions through the end of July 1944.  Targets included industrial sites, oil refineries, storage plants, submarine pens, airfields and communications centers in Germany, France, the Netherlands, Belgium, Norway and Poland. Targets included a chemical plant in Ludwigshafen, an aircraft assembly plant in Braunschweig, ball bearing plants at Schweinfurt and Leipzig, synthetic oil refineries at Merseburg and Gelsenkirchen, marshalling yards at Hamm and Reims and airfields in le Mesnil-au-Val and Berlin.

On 20 December 1943, a B-17 of the squadron was involved in an encounter with a Bf 109 that came to light in the late 1980s—the German fighter pilot, Franz Stigler, held his fire to allow the damaged B-17 and its injured crew to return to England.

The squadron received a second DUC for its attack on the FW190 aircraft factory at Oschersleben and the Junkers factory at Halberstadt on 11 January 1944.  The programmed fighter escort encountered prohibitive weather, as did two of the three divisions making the attack.  However, weather in the east was sufficiently clear that the Luftwaffe was able to assemble the largest interceptor force to oppose an attack for the preceding three months.  However, the squadron flew into enemy territory without fighter escort to complete its mission.

The squadron was occasionally diverted from the strategic bombing campaign to perform close air support and interdiction missions.  It supported Operation Crossbow by attacking V-1 flying bomb and V-2 rocket launch sites.  It bombed airfields, radar stations and other installations to prepare for Operation Overlord, the Normandy invasion in June 1944.  On D-Day, it bombed defended positions just ahead of the Allied landings and struck airfields, rail choke points, and gun emplacements during the campaign that followed.

During the Northern France Campaign, the squadron bombed enemy positions to assist ground troops during Operation Cobra, the breakout at Saint Lo on 24 and 25 July 1944.  It attacked German communications and fortifications during the Battle of the Bulge, from December 1944 through January 1945 and bombed bridges and viaducts in France and Germany to aid the Allied assault across the Rhine, from February to March 1945. The squadron flew its last mission on 25 April 1945.

After V-E Day the squadron was detailed for the Green Project, which called for moving 50,000 American troops back to the United States each month. The squadron moved to Casablanca Airfield, French Morocco, but in June, Air Transport Command decided to use its own, more flexible organization for the project and the squadron was inactivated on 25 July 1945.

Strategic Air Command
From 1958, the Boeing B-47 Stratojet wings of Strategic Air Command (SAC) began to assume an alert posture at their home bases, reducing the amount of time spent on alert at overseas bases.  The SAC alert cycle divided itself into four parts: planning, flying, alert and rest to meet General Thomas S. Power's initial goal of maintaining one third of SAC's planes on fifteen minute ground alert, fully fueled and ready for combat to reduce vulnerability to a Soviet missile strike. To implement this new system B-47 wings reorganized from three to four squadrons. The 527th was activated at Homestead Air Force Base as the fourth squadron of the 379th Bombardment Wing.  The 379th Wing became nonoperational in October 1960 in preparation for conversion to the Boeing B-52H Stratofortress, and the squadron was inactivated on 9 January 1961.

Lineage
 Constituted as the 527th Bombardment Squadron (Heavy) on 28 October 1942
 Activated on 3 November 1942
 Redesignated 527th Bombardment Squadron, Heavy c. 20 August 1943
 Inactivated on 25 July 1945
 Redesignated 527th Bombardment Squadron, Medium on 20 August 1958
 Activated on 1 November 1958
 Discontinued on 9 January 1961

Assignments
 379th Bombardment Group, 3 November 1942 – 25 July 1945
 379th Bombardment Wing, 1 November 1958 – 9 January 1961

Stations
 Geiger Field, Washington, 3 November 1942
 Wendover Field, Utah, 2 December 1942
 Sioux City Army Air Base, Iowa, 2 February–9 April 1943
 RAF Kimbolton (AAF-117), England, 20 May 1943 – 12 June 1945
 Casablanca Airfield, French Morocco, 17 June–25 July 1945
 Homestead Air Force Base, Florida, 1 November 1958 – 9 January 1961

Aircraft
 Boeing B-17 Flying Fortress, 1942–1945
 Boeing B-47E Stratojet, 1958–1961

Awards and campaigns

See also

 List of B-47 units of the United States Air Force
 B-17 Flying Fortress units of the United States Army Air Forces

References

Notes
 Explanatory notes

 Citations

Bibliography

 
 
 
 
 
 
 
 
 

Bombardment squadrons of the United States Air Force
Bombardment squadrons of the United States Army Air Forces
Military units and formations established in 1942
Units and formations of Strategic Air Command
World War II strategic bombing units